Patrick Ortlieb (born 20 May 1967) is a former World Cup alpine ski racer and Olympic gold medalist from Austria. A specialist in the speed events, he was also a world champion in the downhill event.

Born in Bregenz in Vorarlberg, Ortlieb started skiing early at the age of three. He won the downhill event at the 1992 Winter Olympics in France, gathered twenty World Cup podiums (sixty top tens), and was World Champion in 1996 in downhill. At the 1994 Winter Olympics in Lillehammer, he finished fourth in the downhill at Kvitfjell. A month earlier, he won the famed downhill on the Hahnenkamm in Kitzbühel, Austria.

Five years later in January 1999, Ortlieb's racing career ended at age 31 after a serious crash during a practice run on the same slope at Kitzbühel. He suffered a compound fracture of the right femur and a badly dislocated and slightly fractured right hip after losing control and crashing into the safety nets at the Hausbergkante (mountain house corner). Later in the year, he was elected to the National Council of Austria for the Freedom Party of Austria, where he stayed for three years.

He currently runs a four-star hotel, named Hotel Montana, in Lech am Arlberg in Vorarlberg.

He is the father of fellow alpine skier Nina Ortlieb.

World Cup results

Race podiums
 4 wins – (3 DH, 1 SG)
 20 podiums – (18 DH, 2 SG)

Season standings

World Championship results

 The Super-G in 1993 was cancelled after multiple weather delays.

Olympic results

References

External links
 
 Patrick Ortlieb World Cup standings at the International Ski Federation 
 
 Hotel Montana – Oberlech, Austria – Ortlieb family
 YouTube.com – video – 1996 World Championships – Sierra Nevada, Spain – men's downhill – medalists' runs – 1996-02-17

1967 births
Living people
People from Bregenz
Austrian male alpine skiers
Olympic alpine skiers of Austria
Alpine skiers at the 1992 Winter Olympics
Alpine skiers at the 1994 Winter Olympics
Olympic gold medalists for Austria
Olympic medalists in alpine skiing
Austrian racing drivers
ADAC GT Masters drivers
Austrian sportsperson-politicians
Medalists at the 1992 Winter Olympics
24 Hours of Spa drivers
Recipients of the Decoration of Honour for Services to the Republic of Austria
Sportspeople from Vorarlberg
Freedom Party of Austria politicians